Atra Mors is the fifth full-length studio album by American doom metal band Evoken. It was released through Profound Lore Records on  July 31, 2012. Five years after previous studio album A Caress of the Void and also 100th release from Profound Lore. The name Atra Mors is Latin for "Black Death".

Critical reception
Atra Mors has received "Universal acclaim" based on 4 critics at Metacritic.

Track listing

Personnel
 John Paradiso – guitar, vocals
 Chris Molinari – guitar
 Dave Wagner – bass
 Vince Verkay – drums
 Don Zaros – keyboards

References

External links
 Profound Lore Records

2012 albums
Evoken albums
Profound Lore Records albums